is a Japanese voice actress. She was raised in Fukushima. Formerly affiliated for Haikyo, she is affiliated with Atomic Monkey. On anime roles, she played the eponymous character in Vampire Princess Miyu, Wedy in Death Note and Maya Ibuki in Neon Genesis Evangelion. In video games, she played Shelinda in Final Fantasy X and X-2, Kuyo in Genji: Dawn of the Samurai, Karin in Shadow Hearts 2, and Sleigh Presty in Super Robot Wars. Nagasawa attended Nan Desu Kan in 2009.

Filmography

Animation
 1994
 Key the Metal Idol (OVA) – Sakura Kuriyagawa
 Macross 7 – Jessica

 1995
 Neon Genesis Evangelion – Maya Ibuki

 1996
 After War Gundam X – Perla Ciss
 Brave Command Dagwon – Maria Tobe, Gunkid
 Martian Successor Nadesico – Izumi Maki

 1997
 Vampire Princess Miyu (TV series) – Miyu

 1998
 Anpanman – Creampanda Blue Submarine No. 6 – Mutio
 Cowboy Bebop – Judy
 Cyber Team in Akihabara – Kamome Sengakuji
 Getter Robo Armageddon (OVA) – Michiru Saotome
 Princess Nine – Ryo Hayakawa

 2000
 Boys Be – Yumi Kazama
 The Candidate for Goddess – Kizna Towryk
 éX-Driver – Lisa Sakakino
 Gate Keepers – Keiko Ochiai

 2001
 Captain Tsubasa: Road to 2002 – Manabu Okawa
 Case Closed – Yoko Okino (episode 249 – present)
 Fruits Basket - Kyo's Mother
 Love Hina – Tsuruko Aoyama (Bonus episode: "Motoko's Choice, Love or the Sword: Don't Cry")

 2004
 Kyo Kara Maoh! – Lyra
 Mobile Suit Gundam MS IGLOO (OVA series) – Monique Cadillac

 2005
 Onegai My Melody – Patricia
 Naruto – Toki

 2006
 Death Note – Wedy
 Koi suru Tenshi Angelique – Rachel

 2007
 Claymore series – Helen

 2010
 Super Robot Wars Original Generation: The Inspector – Sleigh Presty

 2011
 Mobile Suit Gundam AGE – Lalaparly Madorna

 2012Hunter × Hunter (Second Series) (Baise, Coco Loo)
 2013
 Magi: The Kingdom of Magic – Leraje

 2014
 One Piece – Wicca

Video games
 Angelique – Rachel
 Final Fantasy X – Shelinda
 Final Fantasy X-2 – Shelinda
 Fushigi Yūgi Genbu Kaiden Gaiden: Kagami no Miko – Uruki Mobile Suit Gundam Side Story: The Blue Destiny – Maureen Kitamura
 Atelier Elie ~The Alchemist of Salburg 2~ – Elfile
 True Love Story 2 – Sawada
 Blood: The Last Vampire – Ruria
 Super Robot Wars – Sleigh Presty
 Tales of Vesperia – Sodia, Droite
 Tales of Fandom – Primula Rosso
 Capcom vs. SNK 2 – Cammy and Maki
 Genji: Dawn of the Samurai – Kuyo
 Genji: Days of the Blade – Kuyo
 Shadow Hearts 2 – Karin Koenig
 JoJo's Bizarre Adventure: Heritage for the Future – Mannish Boy

Dubbing
 Cowboy Bebop (Judy (Lucy Currey))

Discography

Drama CDs
 Century Prime Minister (vol. 1–3) – Miki Nagashima
 Skip Beat! – Kyōko Mogami
 Fushigi Yugi Genbu Kaiden as Uruki (female form) 
 Saredotsumibitoharyūtoodoru – Saredo Shivunya
 Hayate X Blade – Miyamoto Shizuku
 Fruits Basket – Momiji Sohma
 Hogen Renai Vol.5  – "Kanagawa Prefecture", "Fukushima" – Hyakuhana Atsumi
 Anime tenchō'' series – Ramika Hoshi

References

External links
  profile at Atomic Monkey
 
 

1970 births
Japanese video game actresses
Japanese voice actresses
Living people
Voice actresses from Fukushima Prefecture
Voice actresses from Hokkaido
People from Obihiro, Hokkaido
20th-century Japanese actresses
21st-century Japanese actresses